The One and Only is the third solo studio album by American rapper Lil Wyte from Memphis. It was released on June 5, 2007 through Hypnotize Minds/Asylum Records. Production was handled entirely by DJ Paul and Juicy J. It features guest appearances from Project Pat, DJ Paul and Juicy J. The album debuted at number 46 on the Billboard 200.

Track listing

Charts

References

External links

2007 albums
Lil Wyte albums
Albums produced by DJ Paul
Albums produced by Juicy J